Hagwilget or Hagwilgyet is a First Nations reserve community of the Gitxsan people located on the lower Bulkley River just east of Hazelton in northwestern British Columbia, Canada.  The community's name means "well-dressed" as in "ostentatious," though another meaning is "the quiet people".  It has also been spelled Awillgate and Ackwilgate and it has also been named Rocher Déboulé - "falling rock" - a reference to a landslide in this area from Rocher Déboulé Mountain, which blocked salmon runs on the Bulkley River at this location.

Hagwilget Canyon
Hagwilget Canyon Bridge

References

BC Names listing "Hagwilget" (community)

Bulkley Valley
Skeena Country
Wet'suwet'en